Carlia dogare, the sandy rainbow skink, is a species of skink in the genus Carlia. It is native to Queensland in Australia.

References

Carlia
Reptiles described in 1975
Endemic fauna of Australia
Skinks of Australia
Taxa named by Jeanette Covacevich
Taxa named by Glen Joseph Ingram